Zahid Parvez Chowdhury is a Bangladeshi footballer who last played as a midfielder or left winger for Chittagong Abahani Limited. He is a former Bangladesh national team player.

References

External links

Living people
1987 births
Bangladeshi footballers
Bangladesh international footballers
Association football wingers
Association football midfielders
People from Hathazari Upazila
Abahani Limited (Chittagong) players
Abahani Limited (Dhaka) players
Muktijoddha Sangsad KC players
Sheikh Jamal Dhanmondi Club players